Marcel Spears Jr. (born May 29, 1997) is an American football linebacker who is a free agent. He played college football at Iowa State. At the conclusion of the 2017 season, Spears was named to the honorable mention All-Big 12 team. During the 2017 football season he was name Big 12 Defensive Player of the Week twice, in back-to-back weeks.

High school career
At Olathe North, Spears was a three sport athlete.  He wrestled and competed in track & field in addition to starring on the football field. His first year starting, as a sophomore, Spears began to bloom with 132 tackles including 10 for a loss. As a junior he recorded 119 tackles, forced three fumbles, recovered two fumbles, intercepted two passes and blocked two kicks. His senior season he made 86 tackles, seven for a loss, made two sacks, two interceptions and forced a fumble. He was named All-Sunflower League twice and received second-team all-state honors by the Wichita Eagle his senior season. He ended his impressive prep career with 227 tackles, 21 for a loss, seven sacks, and four interceptions.

Recruiting
A three star recruit, Spear's only offers were Iowa State, Missouri, Kansas, Idaho, and Wyoming. On July 28, 2014 he committed to the Cyclones.

College career

2017 season
After redshirting the 2015 season and only playing on special teams in 2016, Spears had his breakout season in 2017. He was second on the team in tackles with 96 as well as second on the team in interceptions with two. His 96 tackles were good for sixth in the Big 12 and his 48 assisted tackles were second in the Big 12, only behind Joel Lanning. Against Iowa, Spears made 17 tackles with 1.5 of them for a loss and two weeks later he totaled 14 tackles against Texas. His best two games were against Texas Tech and TCU. Against the Red Raiders Marcel made seven tackles, defended a pass, and made a pick 6 to seal the game. The following week he made nine tackles, one for a loss, and an interception for the second consecutive week. Spears received the Big 12 Defensive Player of the Week award for his performances in both the Texas Tech and TCU games.

At the conclusion of the season he was named Honorable mention All-Big 12 by the Big 12 coaches.

College statistics

Professional career
Spears signed with the Cincinnati Bengals as an undrafted free agent on April 28, 2020. He was waived on September 5, 2020.

References

External links
Iowa State Cyclones bio

1997 births
Living people
Sportspeople from Olathe, Kansas
Players of American football from Kansas
American football linebackers
Iowa State Cyclones football players
Cincinnati Bengals players